The Southern Naval Command is one of the three command-level formations of the Indian Navy. It has its headquarters in Kochi, Kerala at INS Venduruthy. It is the Training Command of the Indian Navy.

The Command is commanded by a Three Star Flag Officer of the rank of Vice Admiral with the title Flag Officer Commanding-in-Chief Southern Command (FOC-in-C). Vice Admiral M. A. Hampiholi, AVSM, NM is the current FOC-in-C SNC, who took over on 30 November 2021.

History

After the independence and the partition of India on 15 August 1947, the ships and personnel of the Royal Indian Navy were divided between the Dominion of India and the Dominion of Pakistan. The division of the ships was on the basis of two-thirds of the fleet to India, one third to Pakistan.

The shore establishments on the southern coast were headed by the Commodore Cochin (COMCHIN), a one star appointment. The COMCHIN directly reported into the Chief of the Naval Staff. In 1967, the Goa Area was included under COMCHIN. On 1 March 1968, the Commodore Cochin (COMCHIN) was re-designated as Commodore Commanding Southern Naval Area (COMSOUTH). In August 1970, the appointment of COMSOUTH was upgraded to the two-star rank of Rear Admiral and was re-designated Flag Officer Commanding Southern Naval Area (FOCSOUTH). This appointment was later upgraded, in October 1977, to the three star rank of Vice Admiral and re-designated Flag Officer Commanding-in-Chief Southern Naval Command (FOC-in-C SNC). On 1 July 1986, the Southern Naval Command was made the Training Command. All the training establishments were placed under the command as well as the responsibility of formulating and executing of training policy.

Area of responsibility
The Southern Naval Command and is commanded by the Flag Officer Commanding-in-Chief. The Southern Naval Command is the Training Command of Indian Navy and is responsible for the training of all its personnel, both officers as well as sailors, from basic to advance stages. It has subsidiary units from Jamnagar in Gujarat to Lonavala in Maharashtra, Goa and in Orissa but the majority of training units are in Kochi. The Indian Naval Academy is also placed under the Southern Naval Command.

Kavaratti Islands is the home to INS Dweeprakshak, the main naval base of the Southern Naval Command in the Lakshadweep islands.

Capabilities
The Southern Naval Command consists of a Flag Officer Sea Training (FOST), a training squadron, training establishments and bases, and land forces and survey ships. It has a naval air station, and a ship repair yard.

Organisation 
The Southern Naval Command is organised as follows:

Naval Bases 

Naval bases under Southern Naval Command are the following

List of Commanders

See also
 Western Naval Command
 Eastern Naval Command

References

Indian Navy
Naval units and formations of India
Commands of the Indian Navy